PMAC, which stands for parallelizable MAC, is a message authentication code algorithm.  It was created by Phillip Rogaway.
PMAC is a method of taking a block cipher and creating an efficient message authentication code that is reducible in security to the underlying block cipher.

PMAC is similar in functionality to the OMAC algorithm.

Patents
PMAC is no longer patented and can be used royalty-free. It was originally patented by Phillip Rogaway, but he has since abandoned his patent filings.

References

External links
 Phil Rogaway's page on PMAC
 Changhoon Lee, Jongsung Kim, Jaechul Sung, Seokhie Hong, Sangjin Lee. "Forgery and Key Recovery Attacks on PMAC and Mitchell's TMAC Variant", 2006.  (ps)
 Rust implementation

Message authentication codes